The Ireland cricket team toured the United Arab Emirates in January 2021 to play four One Day International (ODI) matches between 8 and 18 January 2021. The matches served as preparation for Ireland's World Cup Super League fixtures against Afghanistan in the UAE.

In the first fixture, the UAE won by six wickets to record their first win against Ireland in an ODI match. The second match of the series was originally scheduled to take place on 10 January 2021. However, following a positive test for COVID-19 within the UAE team, the match was rescheduled for 16 January 2021. Two UAE cricketers had also tested positive ahead of the first ODI match. On 11 January 2021, a fourth positive case was reported in the UAE squad. The Emirates Cricket Board (ECB) issued a statement saying that the match scheduled to take place on 12 January 2021 had been suspended.

On 13 January 2021, the ECB issued a further statement saying that the third ODI, scheduled to be played the following day, had also been suspended. No new COVID-19 cases had been reported, and the ECB and Cricket Ireland were continuing their discussions with regards to rescheduling the affected matches. Despite no new cases, the fourth match was suspended on 15 January 2021. Both cricket boards were looking at the possibility of playing a match on 18 January 2021. On 17 January 2021, it was confirmed that a second ODI match would be played the following day. Ireland won the rescheduled ODI by 112 runs, therefore drawing the series 1–1.

Squads

On 28 December 2020, the Emirates Cricket Board (ECB) announced a 19-man training squad in preparation for the series. The ECB announced their squad for the series on 6 January 2021. David Delany was ruled out of the series due to a knee injury, with Josh Little joining Ireland's squad. Little was originally named in the team, but had to self-isolate after a positive COVID-19 result from a close contact. On 11 January 2021, Shane Getkate was added to Ireland's squad, as a replacement for David Delany, and Conor Olphert was added to their squad as a net bowler.

Two UAE players, Chirag Suri and Aryan Lakra, tested positive for COVID-19 ahead of the series, and were both ruled out of the first ODI match. On 9 January 2021, Alishan Sharafu became the third UAE player to test positive for COVID-19, resulting in the second ODI match being rescheduled.

ODI series

1st ODI

2nd ODI

3rd ODI

4th ODI

References

External links
 Series home at ESPN Cricinfo

2021 in Irish cricket
2021 in Emirati cricket
International cricket competitions in 2020–21
Ireland 2021
Cricket events curtailed due to the COVID-19 pandemic